In 1874, Conrad Reid (September 30, 1802 – March 24, 1883) was elected the first mayor of the newly incorporated village (city) of Lorain, Ohio (founded as 'Black River village' by his father, John S. Reid). Conrad served as the village's Postmaster in 1835, and he built a two-story hotel called the Reid House that same year. (His father had also operated an earlier log-structure "Reid House" inn/tavern, nearby.) Conrad was appointed a U.S. Marshal during the Civil War. He resigned from office of mayor on October 7, 1875. The Reid House hotel burned down one month after Conrad Reid's death.

External links
City of Lorain

References

https://web.archive.org/web/20080929074610/http://www.lorain.lib.oh.us/local/history/chronology1.asp [note: many errors in that "chronology"]
https://web.archive.org/web/20061002173612/http://lorain.lib.oh.us/local/history/mayors.asp

1802 births
1883 deaths
Mayors of places in Ohio
Politicians from Wilkes-Barre, Pennsylvania
United States Marshals
19th-century American politicians